Tretinoin, also known as all-trans retinoic acid (ATRA), is a medication used for the treatment of acne and acute promyelocytic leukemia. For acne, it is applied to the skin as a cream, gel or ointment. For leukemia, it is taken by mouth for up to three months. Topical tretinoin is also the most extensively investigated retinoid therapy for photoaging.

Common side effects when used as a cream are limited to the skin and include skin redness, peeling, and sun sensitivity. When used by mouth, side effects include shortness of breath, headache, numbness, depression, skin dryness, itchiness, hair loss, vomiting, muscle pains, and vision changes. Other severe side effects include high white blood cell counts and blood clots. Use during pregnancy is contraindicated due to the risk of birth defects. It is in the retinoid family of medications.

Tretinoin was patented in 1957, and approved for medical use in 1962. It is on the World Health Organization's List of Essential Medicines. Tretinoin is available as a generic medication. In 2020, it was the 230th most commonly prescribed medication in the United States, with more than 2million prescriptions.

Medical uses

Skin use 
Tretinoin is most commonly used to treat acne, both inflammatory and noninflammatory. Multiple studies support the efficacy of topical retinoids in the treatment of acne vulgaris. It is sometimes used in conjunction with other topical acne medications to enhance their penetration. In addition to treating active acne, retinoids accelerate the resolution of acne-induced postinflammatory hyperpigmentation. It is also useful as maintenance therapy for people who have responded to their initial treatment, reducing the prolonged use of antibiotics for acne.

Leukemia 
Tretinoin is used to induce remission in people with acute promyelocytic leukemia (APL) who have a mutation (the t(15;17) translocation that gives rise to the PML::RARα fusion gene).  It is not used for maintenance therapy.

The evidence is very uncertain about the effect of tretinoin in addition to chemotherapy for patients with non-APL acute myeloid leukemia on diarrhoea, nausea/vomiting and heart-related toxicity grades III/IV. Furthermore, tretinoin in addition to chemotherapy probably results in little to no difference in the mortality, relapse, progress, mortality during the trial and infections grade III/IV.

Photoaging 
Photoaging is premature skin aging resulting from prolonged and repeated exposure to solar radiation.  Features of photoaging include fine and coarse wrinkles, change in skin pigmentation, and loss of elasticity.  In human skin, topical retinoids increase collagen production, induce epidermal hyperplasia, and decrease keratinocyte and melanocyte atypia.  Topical tretinoin is the most extensively investigated retinoid therapy for photoaging. Topical tretinoin can be used for mild to severe photoaging in people of all skin types. Several weeks or months of use are typically required before improvement is appreciated.  The benefits of topical tretinoin are lost upon discontinuation. Although it has only been studied for a duration of two years, it may be continued indefinitely. A long-term maintenance regimen with a lower concentration or less frequent application may be an alternative to continued use.

Side effects

Skin use 
Topical tretinoin is only for use on the skin and should not be applied to eyes or mucosal tissues.  Common side effects include skin irritation, redness, swelling, and blistering. If irritation is a problem, a decrease in the frequency of application to every other or every third night can be considered, and the frequency of application can be increased as tolerance improves. The fine skin flaking that is often seen can be gently exfoliated with a washcloth. A non-comedogenic facial moisturizer can also be applied if needed.  Delaying application of the retinoid for at least 20 minutes after washing and drying the face may also be helpful.  Topical retinoids are not true photosensitizing drugs, but people using topical retinoids have described symptoms of increased sun sensitivity. This is thought to be due to thinning of the stratum corneum leading to a decreased barrier against ultraviolet light exposure, as well as an enhanced sensitivity due to the presence of cutaneous irritation.

Leukemia use 
The oral form of the drug has boxed warnings concerning the risks of retinoic acid syndrome and leukocytosis.

Other significant side effects include a risk of thrombosis, benign intracranial hypertension in children, high lipids (hypercholesterolemia and/or hypertriglyceridemia), and liver damage.

There are many significant side effects from this drug that include malaise (66%), shivering (63%), hemorrhage (60%), infections (58%), peripheral edema (52%), pain (37%), chest discomfort (32%), edema (29%), disseminated intravascular coagulation (26%), weight increase (23%), injection site reactions (17%), anorexia (17%), weight decrease (17%), and myalgia (14%).

Respiratory side effects usually signify retinoic acid syndrome, and include upper respiratory tract disorders (63%), dyspnea (60%), respiratory insufficiency (26%), pleural effusion (20%), pneumonia (14%), rales (14%), and expiratory wheezing (14%), and many others at less than 10%.

Around 23% of people taking the drug have reported earache or a feeling of fullness in their ears.

Gastrointestinal disorders include bleeding (34%), abdominal pain (31%), diarrhea (23%), constipation (17%), dyspepsia (14%), and swollen belly (11%) and many others at less than 10%.

In the cardiovascular system, side effects include arrhythmias (23%), flushing (23%), hypotension (14%), hypertension (11%), phlebitis (11%), and cardiac failure (6%) and for 3% of patients: cardiac arrest, myocardial infarction, enlarged heart, heart murmur, ischemia, stroke, myocarditis, pericarditis, pulmonary hypertension, secondary cardiomyopathy.

In the nervous system, side effects include dizziness (20%), paresthesias (17%), anxiety (17%), insomnia (14%), depression (14%), confusion (11%), and many others at less than 10% frequency.

In the urinary system, side effects include chronic kidney disease (11%) and several others at less than 10% frequency.

Mechanism of action 
For its use in cancer, its mechanism of action is unknown, but on a cellular level, laboratory tests show that tretinoin forces APL cells to differentiate and stops them from proliferating; in people there is evidence that it forces the primary cancerous promyelocytes to differentiate and mature into neutrophils, allowing normal cells to repopulate the bone marrow. A recent study showed that ATRA inhibits and degrades active PIN1.

For its use in acne, tretinoin (along with other retinoids) are vitamin A derivatives that act by binding to two nuclear receptor families within keratinocytes: the retinoic acid receptors (RAR) and the retinoid X receptors (RXR). These events contribute to the normalization of follicular keratinization and decreased cohesiveness of keratinocytes, resulting in reduced follicular occlusion and microcomedone formation. The retinoid-receptor complex competes for coactivator proteins of AP-1, a key transcription factor involved in inflammation. Retinoids also down-regulate expression of toll-like receptor (TLR)-2, which has been implicated in the inflammatory response in acne. Moreover, tretinoin and retinoids may enhance the penetration of other topical acne medications.

The combination of the 10% benzoyl peroxide and light results in more than 50% degradation of tretinoin in about 2 hours and 95% in 24 hours. This lack of stability in the presence of light and oxidizing agents has led to the development of novel formulations of the drug.  When microencapsulated tretinoin is exposed to benzoyl peroxide and light only 1% degradation takes place in about 4 hours and only 13% after 24 hours.

Biosynthesis 

Tretinoin is synthesized from beta-carotene. The beta-carotene is firstly cleaved into beta-carotene 15-15'-monooxygenase through site 1 double bond oxidized to epoxide. The epoxide is attacked by water to form diol in site 1. NADH, as a reduction agent, reduce the alcohol group to aldehydes.

History 
Tretinoin was co-developed for its use in acne by James Fulton and Albert Kligman when they were at University of Pennsylvania in the 1960s. Phase I trials, the first conducted on human subjects, were performed on inmates at Holmesburg Prison during a long-running regime of non-therapeutic and unethical testing on prison inmates at Holmesburg. The University of Pennsylvania held the patent for Retin-A, which it licensed to pharmaceutical companies.

Treatment of acute promyelocytic leukemia was first introduced at Ruijin Hospital in Shanghai by Wang Zhenyi in a 1988 clinical trial.

Etymology 
The origin of the name tretinoin is uncertain, although several sources agree (one with probability, one with asserted certainty) that it probably comes from trans- + retinoic [acid] + -in, which is plausible given that tretinoin is the all-trans isomer of retinoic acid. The name isotretinoin is the same root tretinoin plus the prefix iso-. Regarding pronunciation, the following variants apply equally to both tretinoin and isotretinoin. Given that retinoic is pronounced , it is natural that  is a commonly heard pronunciation.

Hair loss 
Tretinoin has been explored as a treatment for hair loss, potentially as a way to increase the ability of minoxidil to penetrate the scalp, but the evidence is weak and contradictory.

References

External links 
 
 
 
 The dewy skin cream-Tretinoine

Anti-acne preparations
Antineoplastic drugs
Aromatase inhibitors
Carboxylic acids
Carotenoids
Cyclohexenes
Hoffmann-La Roche brands
Retinoids
Wikipedia medicine articles ready to translate
World Health Organization essential medicines
Vitamin A